Klaviyo is a global technology company that provides a marketing automation platform, used primarily for email marketing and SMS marketing. The company is headquartered in Boston, Massachusetts.

History

The company was founded in 2012 by Andrew Bialecki and Ed Hallen.

In August 2022, e-commerce company Shopify announced it was making Klaviyo the recommended email solution partner for its Shopify Plus merchant platform, with a  strategic investment into the company.

Software and services

The Klaviyo platform primarily integrates with e-commerce platforms, such as Shopify, Magento, BigCommerce, Stripe, and WooCommerce.

In addition to its e-commerce platform integrations, users can integrate their tech stack like Zendesk, Okendo and Salesforce, directly to Klaviyo or use or a custom api solution when an integration needs to be customized.

Recognition

In 2019, Klaviyo was included in Forbes’ Cloud 100, a ranking of 100 private cloud companies.

In 2022, Klaviyo was ranked amongst the top 500 best workplaces in the US, and in the top 50 best workplaces (medium-sized companies) in the UK.

See also
 Digital marketing
 Email marketing
 Marketing automation
 Mobile marketing
 Online marketing platform
 Real-time marketing

References 

Email marketing software
Digital marketing companies of the United States
Cloud applications
Companies based in Boston
Marketing companies established in 2012
American companies established in 2012